Allan Edward Lard (August 6, 1866 – January 22, 1946) was an American golfer who competed in the 1904 Summer Olympics. He was born in Lexington, Kentucky. In 1904, Lard was part of the American team which won the bronze medal. He finished sixth in this competition. In the individual competition, he finished 29th in the qualification and was eliminated in the second round of the match play. Lard won the North and South Amateur in 1907 and 1908.

References

External links
 
 

American male golfers
Amateur golfers
Golfers at the 1904 Summer Olympics
Olympic bronze medalists for the United States in golf
Medalists at the 1904 Summer Olympics
Golfers from Kentucky
1866 births
1946 deaths